Tyson Lee may refer to:

List of Home and Away characters (2014)#Tyson Lee, a fictional character from Australian television series Home and Away
Tyson Lee (American football) (born 1987), former starting quarterback for the Mississippi State Bulldogs